The Evil Jeanius is a collaborative studio album by American hip hop production duo Blue Sky Black Death and American rapper Jean Grae. It was released by Babygrande Records on September 30, 2008.

The album was controversial because Babygrande took Jean Grae's vocals without her permission and she was largely unaware of the project until it was announced. Years later, Jean Grae responded to a question about the album by writing, "It was a shit thing to do. Fuck babygrande."

Critical reception

Michael Kabran of PopMatters gave the album 4 stars out of 10, saying, "the album lacks the cohesion and comes across like an uneven mixtape, assembled without an active contribution from all parties." Meanwhile, Ben Meredith of URB gave the album 4 stars out of 5, calling it "a powerful hip-hop album, extraordinarily eclectic, and a real treat from the Jean Grae/Blue Sky Black Death collaboration."

Track listing

Personnel
Credits adapted from liner notes.

 Jean Grae – vocals
 Blue Sky Black Death – production
 Blacastan – vocals (2)
 Chen Lo – vocals (4)
 MadAdam – turntables (2, 4, 9)
 Bladerunner – keyboards (10)
 Mark Christensen – mastering
 Charles Wilson, Jr. – executive production
 Ruddy Rock – executive production
 Ben Dotson – product management
 Willy Friedman – product management
 Jesse Stone – marketing

References

External links 
 

2008 albums
Collaborative albums
Jean Grae albums
Blue Sky Black Death albums
Babygrande Records albums